Vice is the opposite of virtue.

Vice may also refer to:

People with the name
 Vice, a professional name for James Kennaby, who established Street Soul Productions
 Vice Ganda (born 1976), Filipino actor and comedian
 Brad Vice (born 1973), American writer

Arts, entertainment, and media

Fictional characters
 Vice (character), a character representing evil in medieval morality plays
 Vice (The King of Fighters), a video game character from the King of Fighters series
 Vice, one of the main characters in Kamen Rider Revice

Films
 Vice (2008 film), a drama film starring Michael Madsen and Daryl Hannah
 Vice (2015 film), an action film starring Bruce Willis
 Vice (2018 film), a biopic of former United States Vice President Dick Cheney, starring Christian Bale and Amy Adams
 The Vice (film), a 1915 German silent drama film

Games and gaming
 VICE, an emulator program, the Versatile Commodore Emulator
 Vice: Project Doom, a 1991 Nintendo video game
 Vice squeeze or the Vice, a squeeze play in the card game contract bridge

Music

Albums
 Vices (Dead Poetic album), 2006
 Vices (Kick Axe album), 1984
 Vices (Paradime album), 2001
 Vices (Waysted album), 1983

Songs
 "Vice" (Miranda Lambert song), 2016
 "Vice" (Razorlight song), 2004
 "Vices", a song by Silverstein from their 2009 album A Shipwreck in the Sand

Television
 Archer: Vice, the fifth season of the animated adult spy sitcom Archer
 The Vice (TV series), an ITV police drama

Vice Media
Vice Media, Canadian-American digital media and broadcasting company
Vice (magazine), New York City–based (originally Montreal-based) international arts and culture magazine
Vice (TV series), a news program airing on Showtime
Vice News, news division of Vice Media
Vice News Tonight, a nightly American news program broadcast on Vice on TV
Viceland, multinational television channel brand owned and programmed by Vice Media

Other uses
 Vice, a Latin word meaning "in place of"
 Vice, the Hungarian name for Viţa village, Nușeni Commune, Bistriţa-Năsăud County, Romania
 Vice (or vice-skip), an alternate term for the third in curling
 Vise or vice, a screw apparatus for clamping work

See also 
 Vice squad (disambiguation)
 Vice Versa (disambiguation)
 Vicious (disambiguation), which can mean "full of vice"
 Vise (disambiguation)